The 1989 Arab Athletics Championships was the sixth edition of the international athletics competition between Arab countries. It took place in Cairo, Egypt from 2–5 October. A total of 43 athletics events were contested, 24 for men and 19 for women. It was the first time that the Egyptian capital had hosted the event, bringing the championship to the largest Arab nation.

Due to technological restrictions, track events were timed to the tenth of a second, while road events were timed into hundredths. Women's full long-distance running events were added to the programme in the form of the 10,000 metres and the marathon (an Olympic women's 10,000 m had been introduced the previous year). The marathon was not the only new road event here, as a women's 10 km race walk was also initiated. It was the first Arab women's walk championship, as same event only started at the Pan Arab Games in 1992.

Medal summary

Men

Women

Medal table

Overall

Men

Women

References

Results
 Al Batal Al Arabi (N°:28). Arab Athletics Union. Retrieved on 2015-02-14.

Arab Athletics Championships
International athletics competitions hosted by Egypt
Sports competitions in Cairo
Arab Athletics Championships
Arab Athletics Championships
Arab Athletics Championships, 1989
Athletics in Cairo
Arab Athletics Championships